Anolis fortunensis is a species of lizard in the family Dactyloidae. The species is found in Panama.

References

Anoles
Endemic fauna of Panama
Reptiles of Panama
Reptiles described in 1993
Taxa named by Ernest Edward Williams
Taxa named by William Edward Duellman